Roman Stary (born December 18, 1973) is a retired Austrian football midfielder who is currently the caretaker manager of Wolfsberger AC.

Honours
 Austrian Cup winner: 2000-01
 Austrian Supercup winner: 2001
 Austrian Football First League winner: 2000-01, 2003–04

External links
 

1973 births
Living people
Austrian footballers
SK Rapid Wien players
FC Kärnten players
Grazer AK players
TSV Hartberg players
First Vienna FC players
FK Austria Wien players
FC Wacker Innsbruck (2002) players
Footballers from Vienna
Association football midfielders
Favoritner AC players